Davis House may refer to:

in Canada
George Davis House (Toronto)

in the United States
Attoway R. Davis Home, Eutaw, Alabama, listed on the National Register of Historic Places (NRHP) in Greene County
Mary Lee Davis House, Fairbanks, Alaska, NRHP-listed in Fairbanks North Star Borough
J. M. Davis House, Juneau, Alaska, NRHP-listed in the city and borough of Juneau
William Charles Davis House, Safford, Arizona, NRHP-listed in Graham County
Davis House (Clarksville, Arkansas), NRHP-listed
Davis House (Norfork, Arkansas), NRHP-listed
Davis Barn (Pleasant Grove, Arkansas), NRHP-listed in Stone County
Scott-Davis House, Romance, Arkansas, NRHP-listed
M. E. Davis House, Dermott, Arkansas, NRHP-listed in Chicot County
Davis-Adams House, Warren, Arkansas, NRHP-listed in Bradley County
Davis House, a University Students' Cooperative Association house in Berkeley, California
Thomas Davis House (Kenton, Delaware), NRHP-listed in Kent County
Robert Davis Farmhouse, Millsboro, Delaware, NRHP-listed in Sussex County
Waite-Davis House, Apopka, Florida, NRHP-listed in Orange County
Joshua Davis House (Mt. Pleasant, Florida), NRHP-listed in Gadsden County
John A. Davis House, Albany, Georgia, NRHP-listed in Dougherty County
Josiah Davis House, Canoochee, Georgia, NRHP-listed in Emanuel County
Daniel M. Davis House, Dahlonega, Georgia, NRHP-listed in Lumpkin County, Georgia
Pyle-Davis House, Demorest, Georgia, NRHP-listed in Habersham County
Strong-Davis-Rice-George House, Eatonton, Georgia, NRHP-listed in Putnam County
Davis-Felton Plantation, Henderson, Georgia, NRHP-listed in Houston County
Davis-Guttenberger-Rankin House, Macon, Georgia, NRHP-listed in Bibb County
Davis-Edwards House, Monroe, Georgia, NRHP-listed in Walton County
Walters-Davis House, Toccoa, Georgia, NRHP-listed in Stephens County
Davis-Proctor House, Twin City, Georgia, NRHP-listed in Emanuel County
R. K. Davis House, Boise, Idaho, NRHP-listed in Ada County
E. F. Davis House, Paris, Idaho, NRHP-listed in Bear Lake County
David Davis III & IV House, Bloomington, Illinois, NRHP-listed in McLean County
Timothy Davis House, Elkader, Iowa, NRHP-listed in Iowa
Howell J. Davis House, Owensboro, Kentucky, NRHP-listed in Kentucky
Daniel Davis House (Paintsville, Kentucky), NRHP-listed in Johnson County
E. M. Davis Farm, Shelbyville, Kentucky, NRHP-listed in Shelby County
Kidd-Davis House, Ruston, Louisiana, NRHP-listed in Louisiana
John Davis House (Chelsea, Maine), NRHP-listed in Kennebec County
Davis-Warner House, Takoma Park, Maryland, NRHP-listed in Montgomery County
Holt-Cummings-Davis House, Andover, Massachusetts, NRHP-listed in Essex County
Robert S. Davis House, Brookline, Massachusetts, NRHP-listed in Norfolk County
Thomas Aspinwall Davis House, Brookline, Massachusetts, NRHP-listed in Norfolk County
William Morris Davis House, Cambridge, Massachusetts, NRHP-listed in Middlesex County
Davis-Freeman House, Gloucester, Massachusetts, NRHP-listed in Essex County
Ephraim Davis House, Haverhill, Massachusetts, NRHP-listed in Essex County
Brown-Davis-Frost Farm, Jefferson, Massachusetts, NRHP-listed in Worcester County
Seth Davis House, Newton, Massachusetts, NRHP-listed in Middlesex County
Dr. Frank Davis House, Quincy, Massachusetts, NRHP-listed in Norfolk County
Rodney Davis Three-Decker, Worcester, Massachusetts, NRHP-listed in Worcester County
Isaac Davis House, Worcester, Massachusetts, NRHP-listed in Worcester County
Wesley Davis Three-Decker, Worcester, Massachusetts, NRHP-listed in Worcester County
Joseph Davis House, Worcester, Massachusetts, NRHP-listed in Worcester County
Davis Carriage House, Saginaw, Michigan, NRHP-listed in Michigan
E. C. Davis House, Crookston, Minnesota, NRHP-listed in Minnesota
Reuben Davis House, Aberdeen, Mississippi, NRHP-listed in Mississippi
Davis House (Enterprise, Mississippi), NRHP-listed in Mississippi
James S. Davis House, Iuka, Mississippi, NRHP-listed in Mississippi
Davis-Mitchell House, Vicksburg, Mississippi, NRHP-listed in Mississippi
Davis House (Albuquerque, New Mexico), NRHP-listed in Bernalillo County, New Mexico
Davis Town Meeting House, Coram, New York, NRHP-listed in Suffolk County, New York
Charles Homer Davis House, Lloyd Harbor, New York, NRHP-listed in Suffolk County, New York
Phineas Davis Farmstead, Mexico, New York, NRHP-listed in Oswego County, New York
Lasher-Davis House, Nelliston, New York, NRHP-listed in Montgomery County, New York
Davis Stone House, Rochester, New York, NRHP-listed in Ulster County, New York
Davis Family House, Crabtree, North Carolina, NRHP-listed in North Carolina
John Davis House (Fayetteville, North Carolina), NRHP-listed in Cumberland County, North Carolina
Archibald H. Davis Plantation, Justice, North Carolina, NRHP-listed in Franklin County, North Carolina
McClelland-Davis House, Statesville, North Carolina, NRHP-listed in North Carolina
Davis-Whitehead-Harriss House, Wilson, North Carolina, NRHP-listed in North Carolina
Davis-Adcock Store, Wilbon, North Carolina, NRHP-listed in Wake County, North Carolina
Samuel Davis House (Mifflin Township, Franklin County, Ohio), NRHP-listed in Franklin County, Ohio, in the Columbus, Ohio area
Alexander Davis Cabin, Dublin, Ohio, NRHP-listed in Franklin County, Ohio
Alexander Davis House, Dublin, Ohio, NRHP-listed in Franklin County, Ohio
Anson Davis House, Dublin, Ohio, NRHP-listed in Franklin County, Ohio
Anson Davis Springhouse, Dublin, Ohio, NRHP-listed in Franklin County, Ohio
James Davis Farm, Dublin, Ohio, NRHP-listed in Franklin County, Ohio
James Davis Barn, Dublin, Ohio, NRHP-listed in Franklin County, Ohio
Samuel Henry Davis House, Dublin, Ohio, NRHP-listed in Franklin County, Ohio
Smith-Davis House, Lebanon, Ohio, NRHP-listed in Ohio
John and Magdalena Davis Farm, Oregon City, Oregon, NRHP-listed in Clackamas County, Oregon
Daniel Davis House and Barn, Birmingham, Pennsylvania, NRHP-listed in southern Chester County, Pennsylvania
David Davis Farm, New Holland, Pennsylvania, NRHP-listed in Lancaster County, Pennsylvania
Winnie Davis Hall, Gaffney, South Carolina, NRHP-listed in Cherokee County, South Carolina
Davis House (Manning, South Carolina), NRHP-listed in South Carolina
Davis Plantation (Monticello, South Carolina), NRHP-listed in Fairfield County, South Carolina
Amy A. Davis House, Watertown, South Dakota, NRHP-listed in South Dakota
Davis-Hull House, Carthage, Tennessee, NRHP-listed in Tennessee
Stokely Davis House, Franklin, Tennessee, NRHP-listed in Williamson County, Tennessee
Sam Davis House (Smyrna, Tennessee), NRHP-listed in Rutherford County, Tennessee
James R. Davis House, Walland, Tennessee, NRHP-listed in Tennessee
George R. Davis House, Abilene, Texas, NRHP-listed in Taylor County, Texas
George W. Davis House, Bastrop, Texas, NRHP-listed in Bastrop County, Texas
William and Anna Davis House, Gainesville, Texas, NRHP-listed in Texas
Davis-Hill House, McKinney, Texas, NRHP-listed in Texas
H. L. Davis House, McKinney, Texas, NRHP-listed in Texas
Davis House (Salado, Texas), NRHP-listed in Texas
Ben and Mary Davis House, Wharton, Texas, NRHP-listed in Texas
David E. House, Rush Valley, Utah, NRHP-listed in Utah
Joshua Davis House (Orem, Utah), NRHP-listed in Utah County
Davis-Ercanbrack Farmstead, Orem, Utah, NRHP-listed in Utah County
Parley Davis House, East Montpelier, Vermont, NRHP-listed
Milldean and Alexander-Davis House, Grafton, Vermont, NRHP-listed
Davis-Beard House, Bristow, Virginia, NRHP-listed
Decatur O. Davis House, Richmond, Virginia, NRHP-listed
Codman-Davis House, Washington, D.C., NRHP-listed
Cyrus Davis Farmstead, Menomonee Falls, Wisconsin, NRHP-listed in Waukesha County, Wisconsin
Cyrus Davis-Davis Brothers Farmhouse, Menomonee Falls, Wisconsin, NRHP-listed in Waukesha County, Wisconsin
H. R. Davis House, Wauwatosa, Wisconsin, NRHP-listed in Wisconsin

See also
Davis Plantation (disambiguation)
Davis Farm (disambiguation) covering Davis Barn, Davis Farmstead and variations
Daniel Davis House (disambiguation)
George Davis House (disambiguation)
John Davis House (disambiguation)
Joshua Davis House (disambiguation)
Robert Davis House (disambiguation)
Samuel Davis House (disambiguation)
Thomas Davis House (disambiguation)
William Davis House (disambiguation)